Gap junction beta-5 protein (GJB5), also known as connexin-31.1 (Cx31.1), is a protein that in humans is encoded by the GJB5 gene.

Function 

Gap junctions are conduits that allow the direct cell-to-cell passage of small cytoplasmic molecules, including ions, metabolic intermediates, and second messengers, and thereby mediate intercellular metabolic and electrical communication. Gap junction channels consist of connexin protein subunits, which are encoded by a multigene family.

References

Further reading

Connexins